The Austrian Luge Federation (ÖRV) is the official federation for luge in Austria. It serves as the Austrian representative for the International Luge Federation and is part of the Austrian Olympic Committee (Österreichisches Olympisches Comité).

ÖRV is headquartered in Innsbruck.

History
Since the introduction of the sport Winter Olympic Games in 1964, the members of the Austrian Luge Federation (ÖRV) have won a total of 19 Olympic medals (5 gold, 7 silver, 7 bronze).

References

External website
Official website 

Luge in Austria
Luge